Naasón Merarí Joaquín García (born on May 7, 1969) is a Mexican religious leader and convicted child molester who is the third leader of the La Luz del Mundo church, succeeding his father, Samuel Joaquín Flores, in December 2014.

Early life 
Joaquín García was born on May 7, 1969 in the Mexican city of Guadalajara, Jalisco, the fifth of seven children to Samuel Joaquín Flores and Eva García.

Career 
Before becoming the head of La Luz del Mundo at 45, he was (most recently) a minister for the group in Santa Ana, California, and previously served as minister for other congregations in cities throughout California (Huntington Park, San Diego, East Los Angeles, Santa Maria) and Arizona.

He continues to be named as Legal Representative of the church in Mexico in spite of having been convicted of child sex crimes. Because his religious registry is against Mexican Law now that he has been sentenced, there is currently a petition to remove his name from both The Light of The World church (iglesia La Luz del Mundo) and the Levitical Fraternity (Fraternidad Levítico) in that country. revocar-registros-religiosos-de-njg-pederasta-confeso

Arrest and legal proceedings 

On June 3, 2019, Joaquín García was arrested and charged by prosecutors from Los Angeles County with sexual abuse charges involving minors. Two days before his trial, Naasón Joaquín Garcia pleaded guilty to three charges related to sexually abusing children.   On June 8, 2022, he was convicted and sentenced to 16 years and 8 months in prison.

Susana Medina Oaxaca and Alondra Ocampo were also charged. Joaquín García was held on $50 million bail, Ocampo on $25 million, and Oaxaca remained free on bail. A fourth defendant, Azalea Rangel Melendez, who was previously charged with rape, is still at-large. Also, a February federal lawsuit against the church and Joaquín García alleging that he and his father sexually abused a Southern California girl regularly from the time she was twelve until she was eighteen is still pending.

He was transferred to North Kern State Prison for evaluations to determine his placement within the prison system. He will soon face a civil trial for such crimes as human trafficking and forced labor. The RICO suit names him, the organization called Light of the World, his mother, his wife, his brother, and many of the leaders of the organization. Federal criminal investigations are pending in both the United States and Mexico.

Personal life 
He is married to Alma Zamora, and they have three children: Adoraím, Eldaí, Sibma.

References 

Mexican religious leaders
1969 births
Living people
American religious leaders